Rhynchotegium serrulatum is a species of moss in the Brachytheciaceae family. It is mainly distributed throughout the Americas.

Rhynchotegium serrulatum is known to be able to use artificial light to grow in places which are otherwise devoid of natural light, such as Niagara Cave.

References 

Hypnales